The Forgotten Hills are a small group of hills  southeast of the Intention Nunataks, at the west side of the head of Astronaut Glacier in Victoria Land, Antarctica. They were named by the Southern Party of the New Zealand Geological Survey Antarctic Expedition, 1966–67, because none of the three parties that had visited the area had time to examine these hills. These hills lie situated on the Pennell Coast, a portion of Antarctica lying between Cape Williams and Cape Adare.

References 

Hills of Victoria Land
Pennell Coast